Iqbal Mohammed is a British screenwriter. He has written short films including his directorial debut, Against the Norm, which premiered at Odeon Cinema in Huddersfield on 3 March 2013. He also works as a pharmacist.

Filmography

References

Living people
British male screenwriters
Year of birth missing (living people)